The 2004–05 Women's National Cricket League season was the ninth season of the Women's National Cricket League, the women's domestic limited overs cricket competition in Australia. The tournament started on 30 October 2004 and finished on 13 February 2005. Victorian Spirit won the tournament for the second time after finishing second on the ladder at the conclusion of the group stage and beating defending champions New South Wales Breakers by two games to one in the finals series.

Ladder

Fixtures

1st final

2nd final

3rd final

Statistics

Highest totals

Most runs

Most wickets

References

External links
 Series home at ESPNcricinfo

 
Women's National Cricket League seasons
 
Women's National Cricket League